Elijah Vance (1801–1871) was a Democratic politician from Butler County, Ohio. He was Speaker of the Ohio Senate in 1835 and 1836.

Elijah Vance was born at Bel Air, Maryland on February 1, 1801. He came to Ohio in 1816, and lived at Cincinnati. He moved to Lebanon, Ohio in 1821. He studied law under Francis Dunlavy, and was admitted to the bar in 1826. He moved to Hamilton, Butler County, Ohio and practiced law.

Vance was elected to the Ohio House of Representatives from Butler County for the 31st and 32nd General Assemblies, (1832 to 1834). He was elected to the Ohio Senate for the 33rd to 36th General Assemblies, (1834 to 1838). For the 34th and 35th General Assemblies, (1835 to 1837), he was President of the Ohio Senate.

Vance was Prosecuting Attorney of Butler County from 1839 to 1843, and was elected Common Pleas Judge in 1843. In 1850, he was a member of the State Constitutional Convention. He was prosecuting attorney again from 1865 to 1870. He was also a member of the local board of education, and a trustee of Miami University.

Vance died January 11, 1871. He is buried at Greenwood Cemetery (Hamilton, Ohio).

Notes

References

Ohio Constitutional Convention (1850)
Presidents of the Ohio State Senate
Members of the Ohio House of Representatives
Miami University trustees
Politicians from Hamilton, Ohio
19th-century American politicians
1801 births
1871 deaths
County district attorneys in Ohio
Burials at Greenwood Cemetery (Hamilton, Ohio)